Cooking Fighter Hao (sometimes The Blazing Chef: Cooking Fighter Hao or simply Cooking Fighter) is an action game and one of the first games from developer Nippon Ichi. The fighting is done by cooking with several materials around the battlefield.

Gameplay
Battles take place in an overhead screen, the characters being represented by super deformed characters. Each level has a type of animal (chicken, crab, etc.) which must be beaten with a weapon and then turned into a meal. Vegetables are strewn across the battle field that can be thrown into the meat to create a different meal and different methods of cooking can be used, thus creating a wide variety of combinations. The winner is determined by who gets the most points after the meals are cooked.

Story Mode lets the player use Hao as he battles different chefs. Free Mode allows the player choose between eleven different chefs and a second player can join.

References

1998 video games
Action video games
Cooking video games
Japan-exclusive video games
Nippon Ichi Software games
PlayStation (console) games
PlayStation (console)-only games
Video games developed in Japan